Diamonique is the brand name used by television shopping network QVC for their cubic zirconia simulated colorless diamond, simulated colored diamond, and simulated colored gemstone jewelry (cubic zirconia is a common type of gemstone substitute). QVC acquired the manufacturing facilities, proprietary technology and trade name rights from MSB Industries, Inc. in 1988. Starting in April 2001, QVC began a limited distribution of Diamonique jewelry at Target retail locations. In the 1990s, Diamonique jewelry made up approximately 5% of QVC's sales. Sales of jewelry for QVC have naturally declined as the company has diversified their shopping programming.

Designers 
Celebrities and fine jewelry designers have designed collections of Diamonique Jewelry for QVC.
 Morgan Fairchild 
 Loni Anderson
 Carol Channing
 Judith Ripka
 Paul Klecka
 Tacori 
 Erica Courtney
 Tova Borgnine 
 Michelle Mone, Baroness Mone
 Scott Kay
 Netali Nissim
 Lisa P. Mason

See also 
Diamond simulant

References 

Diamond simulants
QVC
Jewelry companies of the United States
Store brands